Abdul Rahman Al Bakir (1917–1980) was a leading activist and one of the independence leaders in the Arab Gulf states in the 20th century. He was the founding member and secretary of the National Union Committee (NUC), a non-sectarian and pan-Arab independence group established in Bahrain in 1954.

Early life
Al Bakir was born in Bahrain in 1917. His family were Jews lived in Baghdad who later converted to Islam. The parents of Al Bakir were from Qatar. Al Bakir received a law degree from an Indian University.

Activities and arrest
Al Bakir was employed at the Bahrain Petroleum Company in 1936 and then worked in Dubai, Qatar and in some African countries. During this period he also visited various regions, including Zanzibar, Kenya and East Africa where he observed the effects of the British colonial policies which were very different from those in the Gulf states. In the late 1940s he settled in Doha, Qatar, where he involved in ice business, but in 1952 he returned to Bahrain. He was given a Bahraini passport in 1948. In a meeting of the Bahraini political activists led by Al Bakir it was decided to launch a nationalist journal, Sawt al-Bahrain, which laid the basis of High Executive Committee. He joined the editorial team of the weekly newspaper Al Qafilah in 1952.

In 1954 Al Bakir and other progressive intellectuals established the High Executive Committee which would be later renamed the National Union Committee, and he was elected as its secretary. The authorities asked Al Bakir to leave the country after the start of the large-scale demonstrations in country, and he left Bahrain for Cairo where he stayed between the end of March and September 1956. In fact, the authorities ordered him to go to Lebanon.

Following the demonstrations in 1956 the Bahraini authorities arrested three founders of the NUC, namely Abdul Rahman Al Bakir, Abdulaziz Al Shamlan and Abdul Ali Aliwat, who were accused of attempting to assassinate the ruler, Salman bin Hamad Al Khalifa, three members of the ruling family, and Charles Belgrave, advisor of Salman on 6 November 1956. They were detained and sent to Jidda Island. After the trial they were sentenced to fourteen years in prison and exiled to the island of Saint Helena on the orders of Salman bin Hamad on 23 December 1956. Al Bakir made an application to the Supreme Court of St Helena and to the Judicial Committee of the Privy Council to use the habeas corpus which was admitted. Although the Council rejected his petition in the early 1960, on 7 April their case was reopened which was also rejected. In June 1960 two Labor Party members of the House of Commons and some British newspapers, including The Guardian, began to call for the release of three NUC members claiming that the court did not impartially deal with the case. In the late 1960 the Labour Party members demanded that these three men should be released and not to be sent to Bahrain.

On 13 June 1961 Al Bakir, Al Shamlan and Aliwat were freed and went to London with their St Helena passports. Each of them was paid £15,000 for compensation and £5,000 for expenses.

Al Bakir published a book entitled min al-bahrain ila al-manfa~Sant Hilanah (From Bahrain to Exile in 'Saint Helena' in English) in Beirut in 1965.

Personal life and death
The daughter of Al Bakir married Jassim Buhejji, one of the founders of the National Union Committee. Al Bakir died in exile.

References

20th-century Bahraini politicians
20th-century journalists
1917 births
1980 deaths
Bahraini democracy activists
Bahraini expatriates in the United Kingdom
Bahraini journalists
Bahraini people of Iraqi descent
Iraqi Jews